Picacho State Recreation Area is a camping, boating, and general recreation area located on a 9-mile stretch of the lower Colorado river at the site of Picacho, a defunct gold mining town.

Picacho is a popular wintertime/springtime destination for  boating, fishing, hiking and camping.  This remote park is located in the far southeastern corner of California and includes 54 campsites, 3 boat launches, and 5 river camps. Favorite activities at the park include stargazing, and bird and wildlife viewing (including the famous desert resident, the Bighorn sheep).

The mining town of Picacho sat on this spot in the early 1900s. The remains of a stamp mill that was used to crush the gold ore during mining operations is a popular hiking destination.

This section of the Colorado River is a popular stopover for migratory waterfowl - ducks, geese, ibis and cormorants - usually seen by the thousands in spring and fall.  Other waterfowl are found here year round.

Proposed for closure
Picacho State Recreation Area is one of the 48 California state parks proposed for closure in January 2008 by California's Governor Arnold Schwarzenegger as part of a deficit reduction program.

Closure again seemed imminent in 2012 as a part of California's sweeping 70-park closure plan. However, Picacho SRA was never closed, and is fully operational as of 2013. A non-profit group Friends4Picacho was formed in 2012 to promote its continued operation.

Fish species

 Largemouth Bass
 Smallmouth Bass
 Striped Bass
 Crappie
 Bullhead
 Catfish (Channel)
 Catfish (Flathead)
 Tilapia
 Redear Sunfish
 Green Sunfish
 Bluegill Sunfish
 Carp
 Bullfrogs

General information

 Average Depth: 8 ft
 Fishable Miles: 94
 Elevation: 230 ft

References

External links
Arizona Boating Locations Facilities Map
Arizona Fishing Locations Map
Official web page
Colorado River Boating Trail Guide -- Blythe to Imperial Dam

Protected areas of Imperial County, California
Parks in Imperial County, California
California State Recreation Areas